Junior Mwanga (born 11 May 2003) is a French professional footballer who plays as centre-back for  club Bordeaux.

Club career
A youth product of FC Lyon, Mwanga moved to the reserves of Bordeaux on 6 July 2020. He made his professional debut with Bordeaux in a 4–2 Ligue 1 win to Brest on 21 May 2022, in the last matchday of the 2021–22 season. On 3 August 2022, he signed his first professional contract with the club tying him until 2025.

Personal life
Born in France, Mwanga is of DR Congolese descent. Mwanga's half-brother, Thomas Oualenbo, is a semi-pro footballer in France.

References

External links

2003 births
Living people
Footballers from Lyon
French footballers
French sportspeople of Republic of the Congo descent
Association football defenders
FC Girondins de Bordeaux players
Ligue 1 players
Ligue 2 players
Championnat National 3 players
Black French sportspeople